Zheng Saisai was the reigning champion but chose not to participate.

Danielle Collins won the title, her second consecutive singles title on the WTA Tour, defeating Daria Kasatkina in the final, 6–3, 6–7(10–12), 6–1.

Seeds

Draw

Finals

Top half

Bottom half

Qualifying

Seeds

Qualifiers

Qualifying draw

First qualifier

Second qualifier

Third qualifier

Fourth qualifier

References

External links
 Main draw
 Qualifying draw

Silicon Valley Classic - Singles
2021 Singles